Lee Childs (born 6 November 1982, in Yeovil) is a retired British tennis player from England.

Following match victories in 2000, Childs was hailed as "the future of British tennis" and a successor to Tim Henman and Greg Rusedski.
At the 2003 Wimbledon Championships, he famously defeated Nikolay Davydenko in the first round in 5 sets. The score was 2–6, 7–6(2), 1–6, 7–6(5), 6–2. He then lost in the next round to a 17-year-old Rafael Nadal in straight sets, 6–2, 6–4, 6–3.

Growing up, Lee went to Pawlett Primary School. He got his passion for tennis from his head teacher Chris Vincent.

Junior Grand Slam finals

Doubles: 1 (1 title)

ATP Challenger and ITF Futures finals

Singles: 6 (2–4)

Doubles: 12 (5–7)

References

External links

1982 births
Living people
English male tennis players
People from Yeovil
US Open (tennis) junior champions
British male tennis players
Tennis people from Somerset
Grand Slam (tennis) champions in boys' doubles